Sutton-Chapman-Howland House is a historic home located at Newark Valley in Tioga County, New York. The frame house was constructed in the 1830s in the Federal style.  It consists of a two-story front gabled main block, a side gabled one story wing, and a gabled woodshed wing.

It was listed on the National Register of Historic Places in 1997.

References

Houses on the National Register of Historic Places in New York (state)
Federal architecture in New York (state)
Houses completed in 1835
Houses in Tioga County, New York
National Register of Historic Places in Tioga County, New York